Seyyed Jamal ol Din or Seyyed Jamaleddin may refer to:
Seyyed Jamal ol Din Rural District, in Hormozgan Province
Seyyed Jamaleddin, Kerman